Página Siete is a daily newspaper published in La Paz, Bolivia. It was founded on 24 April 2010. Página Siete focuses on politics and economics, but it also has social and culture sections. The government of Evo Morales made several complaints against Página Siete, leading to accusations of censorship of the press.

In 2013, the then director, Raúl Peñaranda, resigned, citing the continuing attacks from the government, stating "The Government is resuming a cowardly attack on Página Siete, a low attack, a vile attack on us because we are an independent newspaper".

References

2010 establishments in Bolivia
Mass media in La Paz
Newspapers published in Bolivia
Newspapers established in 2010
Spanish-language newspapers